The Handball competition at the 2002 Central American and Caribbean Games was held in Santo Domingo, Dominican Republic. The tournament was scheduled to be held from November 21– December 3, 2002.

Medal summary

Medal table

References

 

2002 Central American and Caribbean Games
2002 in handball
Handball at the Central American and Caribbean Games